Fort Butler may refer to:
 Fort Butler (Astor, Florida)
 Fort Butler (Donaldsonville, Louisiana), listed on the NRHP in Louisiana
 Fort Butler (Murphy, North Carolina)